Chevengur is a socio-philosophical novel by Andrei Platonov, written in 1928. It is his longest work and often regard by scholars as the most significant of his works. Although its fragments were published in the Soviet magazine Krasnaya Nov, the novel was banned in the Soviet Union until 1988. Full text of the novel was published by Ardis in 1972. 

The novel was first translated into English in 1978 by Anthony Olcott.

According to N. Poltavtseva, there is reason to speak of a "philosophical trilogy", which includes the novels Chevengur, The Foundation Pit and Soul.

Title of the novel 
There are various interpretations of the title of the novel, which, according to the feeling of its protagonist, "sounded like the enticing hum of an unknown country." “A whole book can be written about the decoding of this toponym". According to Sergey Zalygin and Nina Malygina, it is associated with the words cheva - lumps, bast shoes, and gur - noise, roar, roar. G. F. Kovalev and O. Yu. Aleinikov give a different interpretation, taking into account the predilection of that era for all sorts of revolutionary abbreviations: CheVeNGUR - Extraordinary military invincible (independent) heroic fortified area. Sometimes the "Chevengur space" is localized in the south of the Voronezh and Belgorod regions, or even directly in the city of Boguchar, Voronezh region.

Plot 
The novel takes place somewhere in the south of Russia and covers the late 1910s early 1920's period of war communism and the New Economic Policy, although real events and the area have been transformed in accordance with the logic of the myth. Alexander Dvanov, the main character of the novel, lost his father early, who drowned himself out of curiosity before the afterlife. His adoptive father Zakhar Pavlovich somewhat resembles the writer's father (at the same time, the image of Alexander is partly autobiographical). "At seventeen, Dvanov still had no armour under his heart - no faith in God, no other mental peace ...". Going “to look for communism among the amateur population”, Alexander meets Stepan Kopenkin - a wandering knight of the revolution, a kind of Don Quixote whose Dulcinea becomes Rosa Luxemburg. Kopenkin saves Dvanov from the anarchists of Mrachinsky's gang. The heroes of the novel find themselves in a kind of communist reserve - a town called Chevengur. Residents of the city are confident in the coming offensive of the communist Paradise. They refuse to work (with the exception of Subbotniks, meaningless from a rational point of view), leaving this prerogative exclusively to the Sun; they eat pasture, resolutely socialize their wives, and cruelly deal with bourgeois elements (destroying, Platonov emphasizes, both their body and soul). The revolutionary process in Chevengur is led by the fanatic Chepurny, Alexander's half-brother Prokofiy Dvanov "with the makings of a grand inquisitor", the romantic executioner Piyusya and others. In the end, the city is attacked by either the Cossacks or the Cadets; in a fierce battle, the defenders of the commune show themselves as true epic heroes and almost all die. The surviving Alexander Dvanov on Rocinante Kopenkina (nicknamed Proletarian Power) goes to the lake where his father drowned himself, enters the water and reunites with his father. Only Prokofy remains alive, "weeping on the ruins of the city among all the property he inherited"

Ideological origins 
As in other works of the writer, in "Chevengur" one can feel Platonov's acquaintance with the ideas of Nikolai Fyodorov, Alexander Bogdanov, V. V. Rozanov, Konstantin Tsiolkovsky, Albert Einstein, Z. I. Vernadsky, A. L. Chizhevsky, Georgy Gurdjieff and Otto Weininger. In addition, the novel is seen as a reflection of the theories of Tommaso Campanella and Joachim Floorsky, the worldview of peasant writers of the 1920s (A. Dorogoichenko, Fedor Panferov, I. Doronin, P. Zamoysky). Possible sources for the novel include the Victory Over The Sun by Alexei Kruchenykh and Velimir Khlebnikov.

Interpretations 
The novel is structured in such a way that allows for many different and even polar opposite interpretations: from anti-communist: “revolution is the coming to power of fools” to neo-Bolshevik: “justification of post-revolutionary horror by pre-revolutionary”. From the point of view of N. G. Poltavtseva, the novel can be viewed as "a story about the collapse of the myth of the first creation of the model of an ideal state." T. I. Dronova defines the content of the novel as a "conglomerate" of the ideologemes of communism and Christian apocalypticism.

The image of the protagonist, with his inherent purity and chastity, reflected Platonov's thoughts about Jesus Christ. Many motives and episodes of "Chevengur" is a remind of the Gospel

Genre 
As Leonid Yaroshenko points out

Maxim Gorky called "Chevengur" a "lyrical Satire"

Publishing history 
The text was sent by the author to the editor-in-chief of the publishing house "Molodaya Gvardiya" G.Z. Litvin-Molotov.  who gave Platonov a number of instructions on the completion of the novel, and Maxim Gorky, in a letter dated September 18, 1929, stated: "Your novel is extremely interesting, its technical flaw is excessive stretching, an abundance of" conversation "and obscurity, blurred" action "" . At the same time, Gorky expressed great doubts about the prospects for the publication of the book - and he was right. Despite all the efforts of Litvin-Molotov, the novel, already brought to the galley stage, was never published during the author's lifetime.

The publishing house "Russian Association of Proletarian Writers" also refused to print the novel. According to the memoirs of an employee of the publishing house I. S. Shkapa - Platonov, taking the manuscript, said in his hearts:

 Oh, you pathetic people! They pulled out your rectum, nailed it to the table with a gold nail and said: move! Reinsurers. 

In 1928, the Krasnaya Nov magazine published excerpts from the novel: The Origin of the Master in No. 4 and The Descendant of the Fisherman in No. 6; the magazine "New World" - the story "Adventure" in No. 6. The story "The Origin of the Master" - "artistically, perhaps, the most perfect part of the novel" - was published in 1929 in the author's collection of the same name.

The continuation of the story - a fragment entitled "Traveling with an Open Heart" - was published in the "Literaturnaya Gazeta" in 1971 (issue dated October 6). In the same year, the magazine "Kuban" (No. 4) published another fragment entitled "Death of Kopenkin". In 1972, a French translation of the novel was published in Paris (titled Les herbes folles de Tchevengour) and with a foreword by Michel Heller; it, however, lacked the text of The Origin of the Master. The Italian translation, published in the same year under the title: "Village of New Life" (Italian: Villaggio della nuova vita), was highly praised by Pier Paolo Pasolini. The first full publication of the novel in the West was in London (1978). In the USSR, the publication of the novel became possible only during the years of perestroika: in 1988, this task was fulfilled by the magazine Druzhba Narodov (No. 3-4); in the same year the novel was published as a separate edition and as part of the "Chosen".

References

External links 
 Chevengur. Foreword and translation by Anthony Olcott. Full text in English at Monoskop.org

1928 Russian novels
Utopian novels
Dystopian novels
Soviet novels